John Linson  is an American film producer, television producer and founder of Linson Entertainment. He is known for producing films such as Great Expectations, Lords of Dogtown, The Runaways and the television series Sons of Anarchy and Yellowstone.

Personal life
Linson was born in Los Angeles, California. His father is film producer Art Linson. He is a licensed private pilot and longtime motorcycle enthusiast.

Career

John began his career making music videos. Some credits include producing and directing the Porno for Pyros video "Tahitian Moon". He went on to produce Nirvana's Live at the Paramount and the Guns N' Roses mini-documentary entitled Guns N' Roses Don't Cry: Makin' F@*!ing Videos. His first major film production was Great Expectations directed by Alfonso Cuarón. He has since produced films such as Lords of Dogtown, directed by Catherine Hardwicke, and The Runaways directed by Floria Sigismondi, which was named by Rolling Stone as the #1 rock film of all time. His love of motorcycles led to the creation of the FX television series Sons of Anarchy. After the success of Sons of Anarchy he co-created the television series Yellowstone with Taylor Sheridan. Yellowstone premiered on June 20, 2018 on the Paramount Network.

John produced the film The Comedian, an American comedy-drama film directed by Taylor Hackford and written by Lewis Friedman, Richard LaGravenese, Art Linson, and Jeff Ross. The film stars Robert De Niro, Leslie Mann, and Harvey Keitel. John also produced The Outsider, which is an action crime drama film directed by Martin Zandvliet and written by Andrew Baldwin. The film stars Jared Leto and Tadanobu Asano.

Filmography
He was a producer in all films unless otherwise noted.

Film

Miscellaneous crew

As an actor

Television

As writer

References

External links
 
 Linson Entertainment

Living people
Year of birth missing (living people)
American film producers